Ceratonyx is a genus of moths in the family Geometridae.

Species
 Ceratonyx arizonensis (Capps, 1950)
 Ceratonyx permagnaria (Grossbeck, 1912)
 Ceratonyx satanaria Guenée, 1857

References
 Ceratonyx at Markku Savela's Lepidoptera and Some Other Life Forms
 Natural History Museum Lepidoptera genus database

Ennominae
Geometridae genera